Archibald Buchanan Low (1885–1951) was a Scottish footballer who played in the Football League for Woolwich Arsenal.

References

1885 births
1951 deaths
Scottish footballers
English Football League players
Association football midfielders
Ashfield F.C. players
Arsenal F.C. players
Partick Thistle F.C. players
Johnstone F.C. players